The Heavy-Chemical Industry Drive (usually shortened to "HCI") was an economic development plan enacted in the 1970s under the regime of South Korean dictator Park Chung Hee.

Background
During the 1960s, the Republic of Korea had experienced rapid economic growth following the assumption of power by General Park.  The dirigisme policies instated by Park—nationalization of the country's banking system, and directing cheap credit to the export sector—had produced rapid development in the textiles and apparel industries.  By the time of the Yusin Constitution of 1972, South Korea had gone from one of the world's poorest nations to the middle rank of countries.  However, the country lacked any sort of heavy industry, and was dependent upon the United States for many raw materials and capital goods during the early years. 

The Korean DMZ Conflict (1966-1969) put a scare in the ROK's leadership.  As the Vietnam War ground on, Park and his lieutenants faced the grim possibility that the United States might significantly reduce its military presence on the Korean Peninsula, in order to concentrate resources on the conflict in Indochina while maintaining military strength in Europe.  On the other side of the DMZ, North Korea had amassed an enormous army, and an industrial establishment almost wholly devoted to the supply of its armed forces.  Fearing for the ROK's military security, Park set out to build an industrial infrastructure that could support a modern military.

Structure of HCI
Over the objections of many economists within and outside South Korea, who thought that the country's economy and institutions were insufficiently advanced to handle the transition to a comprehensive industrial economy, Park decided to channel the economic development capabilities of the state into the development of several key industries: steel, petrochemicals, automobiles, machine tools, shipbuilding, and electronics.  Continuing previous policies, the country's banks extended virtually interest-free loans to firms engaged in these sectors (q.v.).  The country's import-export sector, which had previously been dominated by Japanese firms, was instead placed in the hands of export firms controlled by the chaebol conglomerates that had begun to dominate the economy in the 1960s.

Indeed, the chaebol were the key actors in this new economic initiative, which Park dubbed the "Heavy/Chemical Industry Drive."  Since they were the country's largest firms, they were best positioned to undertake the massive capital investment necessary to establish a heavy industrial sector.  Park's economic development ministers further strengthened the position of the chaebol by granting them particularly easy credit.

HCI and the Korean population
By the end of the 1970s, wildcat strikes and student demonstrations had become increasingly frequent. Park remained committed to his economic vision and contemptuous of calls for democratization and distributional equity.  This, however, cost him his life: after ordering the violent suppression of a demonstration in October 1979, he was instead assassinated by the director of the KCIA.

Effects of HCI maintained public attention with incidents such as Onsan illness, an effect of the industrial push in the late 1970s which led to cases of environmental poisoning and gave rise to a grass roots environmental movement.

See also
Chaebol
History of South Korea
Economy of South Korea

Bibliography
 Kim, Eun Mee (1997). Big Business, Strong State.  Albany, New York: State University of New York Press.  .
 Wan, Henry (2002). Development in a Globalized Context.  Cornell University: monograph.
 Yumi Horikane, "The Political Economy of Heavy Industrialization: The Heavy and Chemical Industry (HCI) Push in South Korea in the 1970s," Modern Asian Studies, 39, 2 (2005) pp. 369–397.

References 

1970s in South Korea
Economic history of South Korea
1970s economic history